The 2011 FIBA Oceania Championship for Women was the 14th edition of the tournament. The tournament featured a three-game series between Australia and New Zealand. Game one was held in Melbourne followed by the second game in Brisbane and game three in Sydney, Australia.

Results

Final rankings

References

External links
 FIBA Oceania website

2013
2011 in women's basketball
2011 in New Zealand basketball
Women
2011–12 in Australian basketball
International women's basketball competitions hosted by Australia
Australia women's national basketball team games
New Zealand women's national basketball team games
2011 in Australian women's sport